The Freedom of Russia Legion, also translated as the Freedom for Russia Legion, or the Liberty of Russia Legion is a legion of the Armed Forces of Ukraine, formed in March 2022 to protect Ukraine against the 2022 Russian invasion of Ukraine during the Russo-Ukrainian war. It consists of defectors of the Russian Armed Forces, as well as other Russian and Belarusian volunteers who have not previously been members of military formations.

According to the Legion, the unit consists of two battalions. Oleksiy Arestovych said that "dozens participate in conflicts, hundreds at training and up to 4,000 candidates", and that 250 new members joined the Legion in June 2022.

History 
According to UNIAN, the Freedom of Russia Legion was formed from a company of the Russian army (over 100 people), who voluntarily defected to the Ukrainian side. According to the company commander, on 27 February 2022, with the help of the Security Service of Ukraine, they joined the Ukrainian side to "protect Ukrainians from real fascists". He also called on his compatriots, soldiers of the Russian army, to join the Freedom of Russia Legion, in order to save their own people and the country "from humiliation and destruction".

The first volunteers of the Freedom of Russia Legion began preliminary training in late March 2022. In particular, the personnel of the legion under the guidance of instructors from the Ukrainian Armed Forces studied the peculiarities of the Swedish-British portable anti-tank guided short-range missile NLAW. The commanders of Freedom of Russia units got acquainted with the operational situation on the frontlines. The Legion's stated goals are to repel the Russian invasion of Ukraine and ultimately depose the regime of Vladimir Putin.

The Legion's official Telegram channel was created on March 10, 2022, and its first post called on people to join the armed struggle against the "war criminal Putin". On 5th of April, a conference was held in the office of Interfax-Ukraine, during which the masked men in uniforms who introduced themselves as members of the Legion and said that they joined it after being in Ukrainian captivity. They refused to give their names ("for security"), to answer whether or not the Legion reports to the Ukrainian General Staff, or to give any information about their interaction with the Armed Forces of Ukraine, and they didn't specify information about the Russian units in which they served. They also said that they had already detained sabotage groups of the Russian army, although later the Telegram channel stated that the Legion advanced to the war zone only on April 29.

The Freedom of Russia Legion has reportedly fought alongside the Armed Forces of Ukraine in the Donbas during the Eastern Ukraine offensive. The unit allegedly also organizes arson and sabotage acts inside Russia.

On 11 June 2022, it became known that Igor Volobuyev, the Ukrainian-born ex-vice-chairman of Gazprombank, who left Russia at the outbreak of the invasion, had joined the Freedom of Russia Legion.

On 1 June 2022, the Legion's official Telegram (and YouTube) channel posted a video of a Russian tank ostensibly being captured by the Legion. On 29 June, they wrote that they captured a Russian POW in the Lysychansk area.

Around early July, the Legion allegedly made a statement that it has withdrawn from active fighting, stating on 13 July that they had withdrawn from fighting in order to "restore combat capability". Since then, the official "Freedom of Russia" Legion's YouTube channel has made multiple videos of the Legion's soldiers exercising.

On 31 August, the "Freedom of Russia" Legion, alongside the National Republican Army and the Russian Volunteer Corps, signed a declaration of cooperation in Irpin called the "Irpin Declaration". The organizations also agreed to create a political center, the purpose of which is to represent their interests before the state authorities of different countries and organize a joint information policy, led by Ilya Ponomarev.

In late December a spokesman, alias Caesar, gave an interview. Putting the numbers of the Legion at “several hundred”. He said that: "I am not fighting my motherland. I am fighting against Putin's regime, against evil…I'm not a traitor. I'm a true Russian patriot who thinks about the future of my country."

He outlined the unit’s selection of members includes “several rounds of interviews, psychological tests and even a polygraph” to ensure the loyalty of the recruits. They then went through two months of training before being sent to the Donbas. Operating under Ukrainian command, they are primarily involved in artillery and propaganda. ‘Caesar’ said he joined because his wife is Ukrainian. Some are fighting in Bakhmut and are viewed as part of the wider international volunteers in the Ukrainian forces.

Symbols and ideology 
The Legion uses the white-blue-white flag which is being used by the Russian opposition on the sleeve insignia instead of the official white-blue-red flag of Russia. According to the manifesto of the Legion, published in their Telegram channel in April, they "carry the values of the Free Man of New Russia – freedom of speech, freedom of expression, freedom to choose your future", and their main goals are the overthrowing of Putin's regime and "struggle for the New Russia". The letter L, the first letter of the words Legion and Liberty, is also used by the Legion as one of its symbols. On the right sleeve, the Legion wears the flag of Ukraine (like other Ukrainian foreign legions).

On July 20, the official Telegram channel posted two messages, in which the authors quoted the Tsarist official Pyotr Stolypin and wrote that the Legion sees "the preservation of a united and indivisible Russia within the borders of 1991" as one of its goals and opposes separatism, and that "the most humiliated and disenfranchised among all the peoples of the Russian Federation is the Russian people".

Reactions 
The Russian government has probably noticed the news about the Legion. On 22 June, Nikolay Okhlopkov, a local anti-war activist from Yakutsk, was arrested: the authorities alleged him of 'wanting to join the Legion'. The Legion denies its connection with Okhlopkov. On 14 July, Putin enacted a new law (along with 99 more), under which Russian citizens can be imprisoned for up to 20 years if they "defect to the side of the enemy during an armed conflict or hostilities."

Russian state media rarely mentions "Freedom of Russia". For example, RT has only one video which mentions the Legion.

Several claims have been made that the "Freedom of Russia" Legion is not an actually existing formation, but a Ukrainian PR project (this version is also being spread by state-controlled Russian media and pro-Kremlin Telegram channels, which call the Legion a fake or alleging it was created by Ukrainian intelligence), mostly because of the lack of information. Illia Ponomarenko, defense and security reporter at The Kyiv Independent, commented to The Moscow Times: "There might be some [Russian] fighters, but whether it is organized in the way it is presented remains an open question... It's clearer with the International Legion — there is a large number [of foreign soldiers] and they did take part in combat, for example, in Irpin, Sievierodonetsk and Lysychansk. But little is known about the [Freedom of Russia] legion." The Moscow Times also cited the report in Harper's Magazine which "described how Ukraine did not have the capacity to process and deploy foreign fighters who flocked to the country in the weeks after the invasion, and suggested foreign units were more PR than reality."

See also
Russian Insurgent Army
National Republican Army (Russia)
Russian Volunteer Corps
Dzhokhar Dudayev Battalion
Sheikh Mansur Battalion
Kastuś Kalinoŭski Regiment
Tactical group "Belarus"
Georgian Legion
Russian Liberation Army
Civic Council (Armed Forces of Ukraine)

References

External links

YouTube page
 

Regiments of the International Legion of Territorial Defense of Ukraine
Foreign volunteer units resisting the 2022 Russian invasion of Ukraine
Military units and formations established in 2022
Military units and formations of Ukraine in the war in Donbas
Russia–Ukraine relations
Russian defectors
Territorial defence battalions of Ukraine
Resistance during the 2022 Russian invasion of Ukraine
Military units and formations of the 2022 Russian invasion of Ukraine